KIOA (93.3 FM) is a commercial radio station in Des Moines, Iowa.  It is owned by the Des Moines Radio Group subsidiary of Saga Communications and airs a Classic Hits radio format.  The station's studios are located at 1416 Locust Street along with Saga's other Des Moines stations (KSTZ, KAZR, KOEZ, KRNT and KPSZ).  The transmitter is located off 24th Street SE, near 6th Avenue SE, in Altoona.

KIOA broadcasts in the HD Radio hybrid format.  Its HD2 subchannel carries a contemporary hit radio format branded as "Hits 99.9", which is also heard on 250–watt FM translator station 99.9 K260AM in Des Moines.

History

KWDM
The 93.3 frequency got its start on September 18, 1964 as KWDM.  George Webber, who was the founder of the original KWDM (1150 AM, now KWKY), brought back his unique programming after having sold the AM station in 1959 to the 3M Corporation.  The FM station consisted of block programming of music, including classical, operatic and ethnic music not heard elsewhere in Des Moines.  The schedule also included a weekday talk show, "Listen While You Work," hosted by his wife, Edith Dunham Webber, and Drake University and high school sports.

The station had a huge record library of rare classical and operatic albums. KWDM, located at  University Avenue, was never a top performer in the ratings, but it did have a loyal following.  Unfortunately, that following was not enough to keep it profitable.

In 1968, George Webber sold KWDM to a local group known as the SEQ Corporation. The studios were moved to the Mike Wilson building at 4111 Hubbell Avenue, on the east side of Des Moines.  The format went from talk to rock and roll to country music.  A controversial talk show, the "Hawkeye Nightline," with Russ Lavine, aired Monday-Saturday nights, previously heard on KDMI (97.3 FM, now KHKI).  On Sunday nights, John Birch Society members Jim and Mary Parker hosted that three-hour slot.

Country disc jockeys included Bob Neel, Jack Myer and Rex Youngs.  National news from the ABC FM Network aired 15 minutes after the hour. On April 10, 1969, the station went dark, after the owners of the tower and transmitter site, John and Jean Murphy, shut down the station due to non-payment of rent. A month later, Webber regained control of the station, operating it at reduced hours.  In May 1969, the final selection was played, Tchaikovsky's "Swan Lake" ballet. Although Webber wanted to bring back the fine music format, he lacked the finances and was too far advanced in his years to make a go of it. The 93.3 frequency went dark for two years until 1971.

Top 40 KYNA
In 1971, the 93.3 frequency came back on the air as KYNA, airing a Top 40 format, competing against the well established KIOA (940 AM, now KPSZ).

Although KYNA was programmed well and had high-quality DJs, in the early 1970s, many homes and cars did not have FM radios.  KYNA lasted for only about a year when it was sold to the owners of its Top 40 competition, KIOA.

Oldies KIOA-FM
In 1972, KYNA was bought by the Mid-America Broadcasting Company.  Eventually, the call sign was changed to KIOA-FM, and the station became "Solid Gold Oldies, KIOA-FM 93.3".  From 6 a.m. until 6 p.m., the station aired a 1950s oldies format, and simulcasted 940 AM during the remainder of the day.  Once again, it was hard to establish a listener base on FM radio in the 1970s, so KIOA-FM also struggled in the ratings.

In the early 1970s, KIOA-FM put together a double album of oldies, called "Solid Gold."  It contained 24 hits and has a board game on the inside of the cover.  These collectable records are rare and hard to find.  The records were made to help improve KIOA-FM's popularity and bring in some extra cash flow as well.

Magic 93 KMGK
In 1976, the station flipped back to Top 40, this time as "Magic 93", and with it, a call letter change to KMGK. This was the most successful format to date on the frequency, as the station pulled in good ratings through the late 70s and early 80s.

By the mid 80s, KMGK found itself fighting for market share as KRNQ and KLYF began also playing hit music on FM radio.  KMGK slipped below both of its competitors, and management decided a new format was needed.

Country and Rock hits
An FM station, KJJY, was taking some of the country music audience of KSO's.  It seemed like it might be a good idea for 93.3 to also switch to country as it had a stronger signal than KJJY. The owner, Midwest Communications, promoted the change to "Hot Country Hits, K93FM."  Midwest kept the KMGK call letters for about two years. In March 1986, the station rebranded as KKXI, but it failed to advance in the ratings.

On August 1, 1986, the station switched back to Top 40 for a third time as "Z93" KDWZ, this time using a rock-leaning direction while avoiding titles that sounded Rhythmic or Dance oriented.  Competing head on with the better established KRNQ and KLYF once again was not easy.

Return to Oldies, evolution to Classic hits
On October 1, 1990, KDWZ returned to oldies by once again simulcasting KIOA (AM)'s oldies format as "All Oldies KIOA", along with a callsign change back to KIOA-FM.

In 1993, Saga Communications purchased KIOA-AM-FM from Midwest Communications of Iowa, as the simulcast continued, but the branding switched to "Oldies 93.3 KIOA."  Over time, KIOA-FM's listener base grew and the station became one of the most successful in the Des Moines area.  On November 18, 1996, the simulcast ended, with the AM becoming "Talk 940 KXTK".  The call letters then reverted to just KIOA, with the "-FM" suffix dropped.

In September 2008, the 1960s music was dropped and KIOA evolved into a classic hits format. In addition, the station dropped the "Oldies 93.3" moniker in favor of branding by the KIOA call letters, and changed slogans to "Iowa's Greatest Hits", with KIOA's playlist primarily focusing on the music of the 1970s and 1980s.

Currently, KIOA has a playlist of music from the 1970s and 1980s, with some 1990s tracks being played as well.

Air-staff changes

On July 31, 2007, Saga Communications announced that it would not be renewing the contract of longtime KIOA morning program co-host, Polly Carver-Kimm.  Carver-Kimm had been part of "Maxwell and Polly in the Morning," and had also been news director for Saga's other five Des Moines radio stations. Also in July 2007, Dic Youngs, also known as "Youngsy," announced that he would be retiring from KIOA.  He told a local newspaper that it was not his choice to retire. Youngs had been with KIOA, both AM and FM, for over 40 years, often talking about old-times and playing 45 RPM records on air. Youngs retired from KIOA on his 66th birthday on September 30, 2007. He would move to sister station KRNT on a part-time basis. Youngs remained at KRNT until his death on October 1, 2009, at age 68.

On July 23, 2008, KIOA announced the addition of former Des Moines morning personality Pam Dixon to the KIOA morning show, joining longtime morning host Maxwell Schaffer.  Dixon said, "I feel like the stars have aligned and it was the right time for me to return to broadcasting. I've been a fan of KIOA my whole life and it's MY music."  A Des Moines native and Hoover High graduate, Dixon attended the University of Iowa. She was first heard on KRNT and Q-102 before beginning a 10-year run on KLYF which ended in 1996. Dixon would retire in April 2017. Amy Sweet, who had been heard on sister station KAZR, would join the morning show in 2014. In May 2018, Schaffer left the station after 23 years; he was replaced in July by Luke Matthews. Sweet was let go in January 2020 due to corporate layoffs, and would be succeeded by Heather McGregor. Jeriney, formerly of KRBZ Kansas City, replaced McGregor as Matthews' co-host in January 2022.

References

External links
KIOA History. Accessed June 23, 2006
 KIOA website
 KMGK Promos
 KKXI and KYNA Jingles
 KYNA Composite Aircheck 1971
 KDWZ Aircheck 1989

Classic hits radio stations in the United States
IOA
Radio stations established in 1964